Bulbophyllum taiwanense is a species of orchid in the genus Bulbophyllum. Its inflorescence has 2.4-4" in length with 5-8 orange flowers, each is 1.5" in length.

References
The Bulbophyllum-Checklist
 Bulbophyllum taiwanense
 Bulbophyllum taiwanense, Smithsonian Gardens.

taiwanense